Choi is a Korean family surname. As of the South Korean census of 2015, there were around 2.3 million people by this name in South Korea or roughly 4.7% of the population. In English-speaking countries, it is most often anglicized Choi, and sometimes also Chey, Choe or Chwe. Ethnic Koreans in the former USSR prefer the form Tsoi (Tsoy) especially as a transcription of the Cyrillic Цой.

Origin
According to Samguk Sagi, the Gyeongju clan originates from chief Sobeoldori (소벌도리, 蘇伐都利) of Goheochon (고허촌, 高墟村), one of six villages that united to found Silla; The Gyeongju clan traces their origin back to Choi Chiwon (857–10th century), a noted Korean scholar, philosopher, and poet of the late Unified Silla period (668–935). 
One theory of origin suggests that Haeju clan's progenitor Choi Choong (최충, 崔沖, 984–1068) was given the surname 崔 during the reign of Goryeo king Mokjong.
The progenitor of the Chungju clan is General Choi Seung (최승, 崔陞), also known as Choi Woo (최우, 崔偶), of Silla (known as Cui Sheng in the Tang dynasty)
The progenitor of the Nangju clan is Choi Heun (최흔, 崔昕) of Silla who was a native of Yeongam (Nangju) of the southern Jeolla region.
Choi Ri (최리, 崔理), who was known as the leader of the Kingdom of Nakrang

Clans
There are roughly 160 clans of Chois. Most of these are quite small.  However, Choi is the 4th most common surname in Korea.  The largest by far is the Gyeongju Choi clan, with a 2000 South Korean population of 976,820.  The Gyeongju Choe claim the Silla scholar Choe Chi-won as their founder.

Gyeongju clan  – Choe Chiwon
Jeonju clan  – Choe Bu
Dongju clan 

Haeju clan  – Choe Chung
Saknyeong clan – Choe Hang, Choi Byung Ju (founding member modern era Korean Supreme Court)
Gangneung clan 
Hwasun clan 
Ganghwa clan 
Yeongcheon clan 
Tamjin clan 
Ubong clan  – Choe Hang
Suwaon clan 
Yeongheung clan 
Suseong clan 
Chungju Choe clan
Goesan clan – Choe Sejin
Heunghae clan
Yeongam clan
Taein clan

Etymology
Choi (Hangul: 최) is written with the Hanja character 崔, meaning "a governor who oversees the land and the mountain". The surname Choi also means “mountain”.

Choi (崔), originally written in Hanja, is derived from the combination of 2 ancient Chinese characters:
 is a pictogram symbolizing the mountains;
 is a pictogram symbolizing a bird.

Pronunciation
In Korean, 최 is usually pronounced  "Chwe" or “Chey” except by some older speakers who pronounce it  (this vowel sound is similar to the German ö [ø]). In English, it is most often pronounced  "Choy", which sounds clearly different to its proper pronunciation but some go by “Chey”.

崔 is Romanized as Cuī and pronounced  in Mandarin Chinese.  It is Chēui  in Cantonese and Chhui  in Hokkien.

Prominent people of the past
Choe Chiwon (858-c. 910), Korean philosopher during the Silla dynasty
Choe Chung-heon (1149-1219), military dictator of the Goryeo period
Choe U (???-1249), military dictator of the Goryeo period
Choe Yeong (1316–1388), military general under King Gongmin of Goryeo
Choe Mu-seon (1325-1395), Korean inventor
Choe Manri (???-1445), an early critic of hangul
Choe Sejin (1465-1542), mostly known for his 1525 훈몽자회, aka Hangul for beginners.
Choe Yeong-kyeong (1529-1590), Westerner, purged during the Gichuk Oksa
Suk-bin Choe (1670–1718), concubine of Sukjong and mother of Yeongjo of Joseon
Choe Han-gi (1803-1877), Korean Confucian scholar and philosopher
Choe Je-u (1824-1864), founder of the Donghak movement

Prominent people today

General
Dan Choi (born 1981), American LGBT rights activist and former American officer
Choi Gee-sung (최지성, born 1951), high-ranking Samsung executive
Choi Hong Hi, South Korean general considered the principal founder of taekwondo
Jay Pil Choi, American economist
Choe Jun (1884–1970), businessman and philanthropist
Choe Nam-seon (1890–1957), Korean historian and independence activist
Choi Tae-min, South Korean cult leader and founder of Yeongsegyo
Chey Tae-won, SK chairman
Choi Wonshik, optical physicist at Korea University

Politicians
Choi Kyoung-hwan, South Korean politician
Choi Kyu-hah (1919–2006), transitional President of South Korea following the assassination of Park Chung-hee
Sergey Tsoy (Choi Yong-eun), Russian politician
Steven Choi, American politician
Choe Ryong-hae (b. 1950), North Korean politician and military officer
Choe Kwang, North Korean general and politician

Arts

General
David Choe (born 1976), Korean American artist
Choi Han (최한), South Korean voice actor
Choi Han-bit (최한빛, born 1987), South Korean model
Kristy Choi, Korean-American filmmaker
Choi Seong-woo, South Korean voice actor
Sharon Choi (Choi Sung-jae 최성재, born 1994/1995), Korean-American interpreter and filmmaker
Choi Soo-jin, South Korean voice actress
Susan Choi, American novelist
Choi Won-hyeong, South Korean voice actor
Choi Yang-il,  Yoichi Sai, Japanese film director
Choe Yong-gon (army commander) (1903-1972), high-ranking North Korean official

Actors and actresses
Choi Eun-hee (최은희, 1926–2018), South Korean actress once abducted to the North
Choi Go (born 2012), South Korean actor and model
Choi Ji-woo, South Korean actress 
Choi Jin-sil (1968–2008), South Korean actress, nicknamed "The Nation's Actress"
Choi Jung-won (actress, born 1981), South Korean actress
Choi Jung-yoon, South Korean actress
Kenneth Choi, American actor
Choi Kwon-soo, South Korean actor 
Choi Min-sik, South Korean actor
Choi Ri, South Korean actress
Choi Sung-eun, South Korean actress
Choi Sung-kook, South Korean actor and comedian
Choi Tae-hwan, South Korean actor
Choi Won-hong, South Korean actor
Choi Woo-hyuk (actor, born 1985), South Korean actor 
Choi Woo-hyuk (actor, born 1997), South Korean actor 
Choi Woo-shik, South Korean actor

Musicians and idols
Anita Tsoy, Russian pop singer, wife of Sergey Tsoy
Choi Bo-min, South Korean actor and singer, member of boy band Golden Child
Dasuri Choi, South Korean dancer, choreographer, singer and entertainer based in the Philippines
David Choi, Korean American musician
Seven (born Choi Dong-wook), South Korean singer
G.NA (born Gina Jane Choi), Canadian-born South Korean singer
Choi Hyun-suk, South Korean rapper and member of boy band Treasure
Wheesung (born Choi Hwee-sung), South Korean singer
Jennifer Choi, American violinist
Jenny Choi, American singer and cellist
Sulli (born Choi Jin-ri), South Korean actress and former member of girl group f(x)
Changjo (born Choi Jong-hyun), South Korean singer and member of boy band Teen Top
Choi Jong-hoon, South Korean singer and member of rock band F.T. Island
Zelo (born Choi Jun-hong), South Korean singer and member of boy band B.A.P
Choi Jung-in, South Korean singer
Choi Jung-won, South Korean singer
Ren (born Choi Min-gi), South Korean actor, singer, and television personality, member of boy band NU'EST
Choi Min-ho, South Korean singer, member of boy band Shinee
Choi Min-hwan, South Korean singer and drummer, member of rock band F.T. Island
T.O.P (born Choi Seung-hyun), South Korean actor and singer, member of boy band Big Bang
Choi Siwon, South Korean actor and singer, member of boy band Super Junior
Choi Soo-young, South Korean actress and singer, member of girl group Girls' Generation
Choi Sung-min, South Korean singer, member of boy band Speed and the co-ed group Coed School
Bada (born Choi Sung-hee), South Korean singer and musical theatre actress
Viktor Tsoi, Soviet rock musician, leader of rock band Kino
Choi Ye-na, South Korean singer and former member of girl group Iz*One
Choi Young-jae, South Korean actor and singer, member of boy band Got7
Choi Yoo-jung, South Korean singer, member of girl groups I.O.I and Weki Meki
Choi Yu-jin, South Korean singer and actress, member of girl groups CLC and Kep1er
Yuju (born Choi Yu-na), South Korean singer, former member of girl group GFriend
Hyojung (born Choi Hyo-jung), South Korean singer, member of girl group Oh My Girl
Arin (born Choi Ye-won), South Korean singer, member of girl group Oh My Girl
Cui Jian, Chinese rock musician

Sports
Choi Cheol-han, South Korean professional Go player
Choe Chol-su (born 1969), North Korean boxer
Choi Da-bin (born 2000), South Korean figure skater
Choi Eun-kyung (born 1984), South Korean short track speed skater and double Olympic Champion
Choi Eun-kyung (field hockey) (born 1971), South Korean former field hockey player
Hee-seop Choi (born 1979), South Korean former professional baseball player
Choi Hong-man (born 1980), South Korean kickboxer
Ji-man Choi (born 1991), South Korean professional baseball player
Choi Jin-cheul (born 1971), South Korean former football player 
Choi Jung-won (speed skater) (born 1990), South Korean short track speed skater
Choi Kwang-jo (born 1942), South Korean martial artist, founder and head of Choi Kwang-Do
Choi Kyung-ju (born 1970, better known as K. J. Choi), South Korean professional golfer 
Choi Mi-sun (born 1966), South Korean recurve archer
Choe Myong-ho (born 1988), North Korean football player
Choi Myung-hoon (born 1975), South Korean professional Go player
Choi Na-yeon (born 1987), South Korean professional golfer
Choi Soon-ho (born 1962), South Korean football manager and former professional football player
Choi Sung-kuk (born 1983), South Korean former football player
Choi Sung-yong (born 1975), South Korean former football player
Choi Tae-uk (born 1981), South Korean former football player
Choi Won-jong, South Korean archer
Choi Won-kwon (born 1981), South Korean former football player
Choi Yeon-sung, South Korean retired professional StarCraft player
Choe Yeong-ui (1923–1994, better known as Mas Oyama), karate master who founded Kyokushin karate
Choi Yong-soo (born 1973), South Korean footballer
Choi Yong-soo (boxer) (1972), South Korean retired boxer
Choi Yong-sool (1904–1986), founder of Hapkido
Yuhui Choe (born 1986), Japanese-born Korean ballet dancer
Choi Yu-jin (figure skater) (born 2000), South Korean figure skater
Choi Yun-kyum (born 1962), South Korean football coach

See also

Cui – Chinese surname
Choi
Tsoi
List of Korean family names

References

External links
Official site of the Gyeongju Choi Association, in Korean

Korean-language surnames
 
Surnames of Korean origin